This was the first edition of the tournament.

Aliaksandr Bury and Peng Hsien-yin won the title after defeating Wu Di and Zhang Ze 6–7(3–7), 6–4, [12–10] in the final.

Seeds

Draw

References
 Main Draw

Qujing International Challenger - Doubles